CxK is an unofficial name given to a family of multiple units produced by CAF for Ireland and Auckland. There are four types in operation, and they are the main suburban and commuter trains in Ireland. The name derives from NI Railways "C3K" and "C4K" classes.

Northern Ireland 

NI Railways, the state-owned rail operator in Northern Ireland, has fully replaced its fleet of DEMUs with CxK types.

Class 3000 

The Class 3000 was the first new train type purchased by NIR for two decades, to replace the increasingly obsolete NIR Class 80 units that had been in service since the mid-1970s. The £80m order, the largest in NIR's history at that point, was signed in 2002, with the first unit delivered in 2004. The 23 three-car units enabled NIR to withdraw most Class 80 units. It is the main passenger train type in Northern Ireland, and operates on most routes. The first six units have CAWS to allow operation in the Republic of Ireland.

Class 4000 

The Class 4000 is a follow-on from the C3K. Purchased in 2009, with the first unit delivered in 2011, the 20 three-car units replaced the 13 remaining Class 80 and Class 450 sets, allowing for major service enhancements. NI Railways has an option to purchase 20 trailers to lengthen the units to four cars.

Republic of Ireland

29000 Class 

The 29000 Class is the primary commuter train type operated by Iarnród Éireann, the state rail operator in the Republic of Ireland. Originally Class 2900, they are four-car units primarily used on commuter services around Dublin. The first batch of 20 units was delivered in 2002–2003, a further nine in 2005.

New Zealand

AM class 

The 72 Auckland three-car AM class EMUs carry 373 passengers, and were delivered in two batches, the first batch over 2013-2015 and the second batch 2019-2020. A third batch of 23 EMUs is on order.

Gallery

References

External links 
 Eiretrains - Irish Railcars & DART units
 CAF 2900 Class

Multiple units of Ireland
CAF multiple units
Train-related introductions in 2002